NGC 162 is a star in the Andromeda constellation. It was discovered by Heinrich d'Arrest in 1862. A few galaxies (PGC 2148 and PGC 212552) have been mis-identified as NGC 162.

See also 
 Double star
 List of NGC objects

References

External links
 

Andromeda (constellation)
Astronomical objects discovered in 1862
0162